Thomas Bayne may refer to:

 Thomas Bayne (Sam Nixon) (1824–1888), American politician and former slave
 Thomas McKee Bayne (1836–1894), American lawyer, politician and American Civil War Union colonel
 Thomas Vere Bayne (1829–1908), British academic at the University of Oxford